= Republic of Hindutva =

Book by Badri Narayan

- First edition
- Author: Badri Narayan
- Subject: Politics
- Published: 15 March 2021 (Penguin)
- Publication place: India
- Media type: Book
- Pages: 240
- ISBN: 978-0670094042

Republic of Hindutva is a 2021 political commentary book by Indian social historian, Badri Narayan. The book is a field study of how the RSS keeps reinventing itself to spread its worldview.
